Atoll is a French progressive rock band.

Discography
 1974 : Musiciens Magiciens
 1975 : L'Araignée-Mal
 1977 : Tertio
 1979 : Rock Puzzle
 1989 : L'Océan
 1990 : Tokyo, C'est Fini (Live)
 2003 : Illian - J'entends Gronder La Terre

External links 
 Official Site André Balzer Atoll | Official
 
 

French progressive rock groups